Flossie, a Venus of Fifteen is an English erotic novel, first published in 1897.

Synopsis 
The novel recounts the adventures of an immature young person of distinct cockney type, who begins to fully satisfy her male admirers at a very early age, and manages to retain her physical virginity until the last few pages. According to the publisher Charles Carrington, "The book has no other pretension than to be thoroughly obscene".

Publication 
Th first edition was printed at Amsterdam for the author in the latter half of the year 1897:

The first and limited edition was soon sold out, but it was immediately reprinted, "for the Erotica Biblion Society of London and New York", n.d. (Paris, 1898), small 12mo. of 122 pages, and there were two or three more re-issues by 1902. The work is sometimes attributed to Algernon Charles Swinburne.

Censorship 
The book was published privately and anonymously with misleading notices: "Printed at Carnopolis" (1897), and "Printed for the Erotica Biblion Society Society of London and New York" (1898); no doubt to confuse the authorities, as such works were illegal and publishers and booksellers were prosecuted.

On 19 April 1933, London bookseller William Hamilton, charged with selling two obscene books described only as "absolute filth", was sentenced to 3 months' imprisonment in the second division and fined £100 and 10 guineas costs. The works in question, described by the Magistrate as the worst that could be imagined, were Flossie and The Autobiography of a Flea.

See also 

 Obscene Publications Acts
 Pornotopia

References

Sources 

 Druce, Robert (1995). "Pulex Defixus, or, the Spellbound Flea: An Excursion Into Porno-Gothic". In Tinkler-Villani, Valeria; Davidson, Peter; Stevenson, Jane (eds.). Exhibited by Candlelight: Sources and Developments in the Gothic Tradition. Brill. pp. 221–242. .
 Larsson, Mariah (2007). "Drömmen om den goda pornografin. Om sextio-och sjuttiotalsfilmen och gränsen mellan konst och pornografi". Tidskrift för genusvetenskap, no. 1–2. pp. 31–111.
 Thomas, Donald (1969). A Long Time Burning: The History of Literary Censorship in England. New York and Washington: Frederick A. Praeger. p. 284.

Attribution:

 Carrington, John ["An Old Bibliophile"] (1902). Forbidden Books: Notes and Gossip on Tabooed Literature. Paris: For the Author and his Friends. pp. 140–145.

Further reading 

 Sigel, Lisa Z. (2000). "Name Your Pleasure: The Transformation of Sexual Language in Nineteenth-Century British Pornography". Journal of the History of Sexuality, 9(4). pp. 395–419.
 Flossie, a Venus of Fifteen by One who knew this Charming Goddess and Worshipped at her Shrine. Printed for the Erotica Biblion Society of London and New York. [1930s reprint]. 96 pages.
 "Flossie: A Venus of Fifteen (1897)". The Jack Horntip Collection. Retrieved 12 November 2022.

1897 British novels
British erotic novels
Works published anonymously
Works by Algernon Charles Swinburne